The Bobodioufs is a humorous television series written and directed by Patrick Martinet and former partner Adjaratou Dembele. With more than 150 episodes of laughter and entertainment, Bobodioufs was produced by Frame society in Burkina Faso from 2000 to 2015. It is the most watched television series in Francophone Africa.

History 
Created and produced by Patrick Martinet and Adjaratou Dembele, the series was broadcast by French media Cooperation Agency (CFI), TV5, the Rtb and several other African channels. Before, it was of little stories, news items daily and an episode corresponded to a daily practice, one of those stories. After by cons, it has become a soap opera with twenty episodes twice a year. This series chronicles of everyday life in a city Burkina Faso (Bobo Dioulasso): miseries, joys, all with humor. This also explains its success. "The stories have their origins in everyday life. People are concerned because it can happen to everyone."

Origin 
Siriki is the little brother of souke's friend, a musician from Burkina Faso. Their first encounter was in the kingdom of Abu. He was reacting and they said things were so much laughter around them. Then, the director was inspired by these teasers.

En 2004, Patrick Martinet avais expliqué les problèmes qui existaient déja en raison de la fermeture de CFI-TV, le principal client. Cela a fait qu’il y avait environ 50% en moins sur les droits de diffusion. Il fallait donc faire un effort cette fois-ci avant de trouver un système qui permettrait de redémarrer correctement.

Members 
The Bobodioufs, the series that made laugh millions of people in Africa and beyond, has met considerable success worldwide. The main actors are Siriki and Souké.
 Pauline Ouattara
 Frédéric Soré "Siriki"
 Mahamoudou Tiendrébéogo "Souké"
 André Bougouma "Tonton Brama"
 Fati Millogo "Tanti Abi"

External links 
  All episods of  Bobodioufs on Youtube, Youtube

Mass media in Burkina Faso
Comedy-drama television series